The 2017 UCI Track Cycling World Championships were the World Championships for track cycling in 2017. They took place in Hong Kong in the Hong Kong Velodrome from 12 to 16 April 2017. The last time the championships took place in Asia was at the 1990 UCI Track Cycling World Championships in Japan at the Green Dome Maebashi.

Bidding
Turkmenistan showed their interest in hosting the championships at the Opening Ceremony of the Olympic Council of Asia General Assembly in September 2015. The Central Asian country's President Gurbanguly Berdimuhamedov expressed his intention in which he reiterated his aim to use sport to raise the profile of the nation. Berdimuhamedov described the proposal as "fully in accord" with the plans of the nation, adding that the country has "all the necessary conditions". Igor Makarov, the Ashgabat-born president of the Russian Cycling Federation, outlined the attractions of the Ashgabat Sports Complex Velodrome. The velodrome is among the largest velodromes in the world with room for 6000 spectators. He appealed directly to the president to consider bidding for the event. The championships would represent the largest-profile sporting event ever held in Turkmenistan.

Announcement
UCI president Brian Cookson announced that Hong Kong would host the championships at the 2016 UCI Track Cycling World Championships. He praised Hong Kong for their organisation of the final round of 2015–2016 UCI Track Cycling World Cup, which took place at the end of January 2016.

Schedule
The schedule of events was as follows:

A = Afternoon session, E = Evening sessionQ = qualifiers, R1 = first round, R2 = second round, R = repechages 1/16 = sixteenth finals, 1/8 = eighth finals, QF = quarterfinals, SF = semifinalsSR = Scratch Race, TR = Tempo Race, ER = Elimination Race, PR = Points Race

Medal summary

Medal table

Medalists

Notes
Riders named in italics did not participate in the medal finals.
 Contested in the Olympics as an intra-omnium discipline only.
 Not contested in the Olympics.

References

External links
Official website

 
2017 in Hong Kong sport
UCI Track Cycling World Championships
2017
2017 UCI Track Cycling World Championships
UCI Track Cycling World Championships